Stock car racing events in the NASCAR Cup Series have taken place at Watkins Glen International in Watkins Glen, New York on the  road course annually since 1986. Since 2018 the 90-lap,  race has been known as Go Bowling at The Glen for sponsorship reasons. , it is one of seven road course races on the Cup Series schedule.

Kyle Larson is the defending race winner in 2021 and 2022.

History

When NASCAR returned in 1986, they utilized the 1971 Six Hours course. In the 1991 race, J. D. McDuffie was killed in a crash in the Outer Loop, at the end of the backstretch. Following that crash, and another serious crash by IMSA driver, Tommy Kendall, the Inner Loop bus stop chicane was added just before the Outer Loop. NASCAR has since utilized this  "short course," and has never utilized the "Boot" as IndyCar and Formula One have. Drivers, however, have been pushing for the use of the full course.

During a 2011 Mobil Oil "Car Swap" at Watkins Glen using the course, Tony Stewart pushed for using the Grand Prix course after driving demonstration laps in both his Chevrolet Impala and the majority of his laps in a McLaren MP4-23 as part of the event with Lewis Hamilton.

ESPN broadcast the race from 1986 to 2000, then again in 2007 to 2014. Starting in 2015 (current contract) NBC had the rights to broadcast the race but the 2015 edition was aired on NBCSN. In 2016 the race was put on USA Network because of the 2016 Summer Olympics airing on NBC and NBCSN. Beginning in 2017 NBC decided to broadcast this race in the style of radio where various analysts would be placed on the course to report what they see in their section of the track to the viewer.

In 2015, more than 95,000 people watched the race.

In 2020, the race was not held due to the COVID-19 pandemic, the State of New York requiring travelers from several states to isolate for 14 days (including North Carolina, where most of NASCAR's teams are located, and Florida, where NASCAR's corporate offices are), and not giving the series a quarantine waiver to enter the state. NASCAR instead held a race on the Daytona International Speedway road course, the Go Bowling 235.

Past winners

Notes
1987, 2009, & 2011: Race postponed from Sunday to Monday due to rain.
1992: Race shortened due to rain.
2005 & 2011: Race extended due to NASCAR Overtime.
2020: Race canceled and moved to the Daytona road course due to quarantine requirements in New York associated with the COVID-19 pandemic.

Multiple winners (drivers)

Multiple winners (teams)

Manufacturer wins

Race summaries
1986: The true inaugural running of this race, resulted in Geoff Bodine leading the most laps. Tim Richmond won the race after Bodine made too long of a pit stop with less than 10 laps to go.
1989: On the day that Tim Richmond, who in 1986 won the first Budweiser at the Glen race since NASCAR returned to Watkins Glen, lost his battle with AIDS; eventual 1989 Winston Cup champion Rusty Wallace became the first driver to win this race a second time (Wallace having previously won in 1987).
1991: Ernie Irvan won the race but the race was overshadowed by the death of NASCAR pioneer J. D. McDuffie during a crash on lap 5. Also during this race Richard Petty collected his final Top 10 finish, coming in 9th.
1992: Rain pushed back the start of the race more than three hours, and with rain expected to move back into the area, teams expected the race to be a sprint to the halfway point. Kyle Petty won a heated battle for the lead with Ernie Irvan between laps 32–36. After a caution, the race was restarted on lap 44, one lap before the halfway point. Petty brushed off then-leader Dick Trickle on lap 45 and on lap 46, the skies opened. After five laps under caution, the race was red-flagged, with Petty declared the winner. 1992 would be the only season Kyle Petty won multiple races.
1995: Wally Dallenbach Jr. appeared to have had the win wrapped up, but a caution with 9 laps to go resulted in him being passed by former teammate Mark Martin on a final restart. 
1996: Two weeks after suffering a broken collarbone and sternum in a crash at Talladega, and one week after stepping out of the car at Indianapolis, Dale Earnhardt won the pole position with a track record of 120.733 mph. Earnhardt was quoted as saying "It hurt so good." Earnhardt led 54 laps, but Geoff Bodine stole the victory when he short-pitted on his final stop. Bodine pitted early, and with newer tires, made up track position while everyone else pitted to hold the lead. It was Earnhardt's final career pole, and Bodine's final career win.
1999: Jeff Gordon started on pole, led the most laps and held off Ron Fellows for the win.
2000: After Jeff Gordon and Tony Stewart tangled early, Jeff Gordon's hopes to win two consecutive Watkins Glen races ended. Steve Park won his first Cup series race.
2001: Jeff Gordon got redemption from his 2000 heartbreak by winning the race. Road expert Robby Gordon led the most laps and had the winning car but a pit road fire ended his hopes for his first Cup series victory.
2002: A week after nearly being fired by his team for an incident in the Brickyard 400, Tony Stewart led the most laps alongside Robby Gordon and won the race. The race ended in controversy because it was discovered that Stewart had jumped the final restart.
2004: A very sick Tony Stewart gutted through a sinus infection, food poisoning and stomach pains, and held off Ron Fellows to win the race.
2007: Jeff Gordon led the most laps, but spun out with 2 laps to go, handing the win to Stewart.
2008: Michael McDowell punted David Gilliland into the barriers on the frontstretch and caused a huge melee including Sam Hornish Jr. hitting the sand barriers and Bobby Labonte hitting the armco hard and going to the hospital for a hand injury. Gilliland got hit by other cars 3 times. A total of 9 cars were involved including Dave Blaney, Reed Sorenson, Michael Waltrip, Max Papis, and Joe Nemechek Kyle Busch won the race, the 8th and final win of his 2008 campaign. 
2009: Tony Stewart won his record 5th Watkins Glen race. The race was marred by a huge accident involving Sam Hornish Jr., Jeff Gordon, and Jeff Burton. Kasey Kahne was racing with Hornish out of turn 9 where Kasey got loose and got into Hornish sending Hornish into the tire barriers. Hornish shot back across the track right in front of Jeff Gordon which sent Gordon into the Armco barrier head on. Hornish's fuel cell came out of his car from Gordon's impact. Hornish was then hit again by Jeff Burton which nearly sent Hornish on his side. Other cars including Joey Logano and Andy Lally were involved for running over debris. 
2010: Juan Pablo Montoya ended a 113 race winless streak and won in dominating fashion, beating Marcos Ambrose for the win, thus making him the first foreign-born driver to win multiple NASCAR Cup races.
2011: Marcos Ambrose's first career Cup series victory over Brad Keselowski and Kyle Busch. David Reutimann flipped over violently after hitting the armco barrier head on into the fence after contact from Boris Said and David Ragan. 
2012: Oil that dropped on the track by Bobby Labonte led to a dramatic finish as a caution was not called. Leader Kyle Busch lost control and spun off the bumper of Brad Keselowski in the Esses on the final lap, leaving Keselowski and Ambrose to battle both each other and the adverse track conditions, banging off of and passing each other several times during the lap.  They even went through the grass at one point.  Ambrose won the race after Keselowski got loose in the oil off-turn eleven and backed out of the throttle.
2014: A. J. Allmendinger won his first Cup victory, after a lengthy marathon that included two red flags for track repair caused by serious accidents: the first for a severe accident in which Ryan Newman and Michael McDowell crashed in the exit to turn 5, which saw McDowell's rear wheel housing break off and puncture a hole in the Armco barriers, and a second one caused by Denny Hamlin crashing into the gravel barrels at the entrance to pit road.
 2015: An accordion wreck happened on the front stretch, fluid was on the track, which led to a nine-minute three second red flag to facilitate cleanup on the track, A. J. Allmendinger's car lost power, and came to a stop past turn 10. Joey Logano took advantage of fuel problems for Kevin Harvick and won his first NASCAR Cup Series race at Watkins Glen and second of the season.
 2016: Denny Hamlin passed Martin Truex Jr. late in the race to win his first road course victory and avenging his 2007 runner-up at the Glen. On the final lap, Truex got spun by Brad Keselowski and finished 8th while Kyle Larson expressed discontent with A. J. Allmendinger for spinning him on the final lap as well. Truex and Larson both voiced their displeasure with their adversaries through slight contact with Keselowski & Allmendinger after the race ended, during the cool-down lap.
2017: Martin Truex Jr. overcame adversity from the 2016 Watkins Glen race by winning the over Matt Kenseth and Clint Bowyer while saving fuel. The race was run in just over two hours, the shortest race by time in the Modern Era.
2018: Chase Elliott earned his first Cup Series win after holding off Martin Truex Jr., the defending winner. Truex Jr.'s No. 78 ran out of fuel on the last lap while behind Elliott and he managed to hold on to 2nd place.
2019: Elliott won his second race in a row at the track, again beating Truex Jr.
2021: No race was held in 2020, but Truex led the most laps in the 2021 edition. However, he finished third to Kyle Larson and Chase Elliott.
2022: Elliott and Larson started up front, but the first part of the race was run under wet track conditions. After halfway, Elliott and Larson drove away from third-place Michael McDowell. Larson took the lead after contact with Elliott on a late restart to take the win, relegating Elliott to fourth.

References

External links
 

1957 establishments in New York (state)
 
NASCAR Cup Series races
Recurring sporting events established in 1957
Annual sporting events in the United States